Malta Parish is an administrative unit of Rēzekne Municipality, Latvia.

Towns, villages and settlements of Malta parish 
  – parish administrative center.

References 

Parishes of Latvia
Rēzekne Municipality